Baboye Traoré (born 25 January 1990) is a French footballer who currently plays for Dunkerque after spending most of his career at Paris FC.

In 2017, Traoré had a short spell in England with Sutton United. He made his league debut on 21 January 2017 as a substitute against Eastleigh. On 29 January 2017 he was a 91st-minute substitute coming on for Craig Eastmond in Sutton's 1-0 FA Cup fourth round giant-killing victory over Championship side Leeds United.

Personal life
Traoré is one of 13 siblings, and is of Malian descent.

References

French footballers
French people of Malian descent
Ligue 2 players
National League (English football) players
Championnat National players
1990 births
Living people
Paris FC players
Sutton United F.C. players
USL Dunkerque players
Place of birth missing (living people)
Association football midfielders